The Babisas Award is given by "Bangladesh Binodon Shangbadik Somiti" (English: Bangladesh Entertainment Journalist Association) or "BABISAS" every year for best performances in media. is an organization for progressive entertainment journalists.

Bangladesh Entertainment Journalist Association was formally created on 30 December 2000 on the initiative and effort of journalists.  After two years it was registered with Directorate of Social Service, affiliated with Ministry of People's Republic of Bangladesh Government, Dhaka, registration no. Dha – 07147.

History
The award has been given since 2004. Babisas is mainly a welfare voluntary welfare organization. Giving active support in preserving rights of members carrying out professional responsibility and giving moral and logistic support to the members who came to harm while carrying out their responsibilities, creating fund for various welfare of journalists, introduction of awards for special contribution of journalists.
 
Babisas wants to make entertainment journalists skilled, experienced and enriched in one hand and on the other hand an organization becomes essential on national level for growth of traditional culture.

Awards
 Best Actor (cinema) 
 Best Actress (cinema)
 Most Popular Actor (cinema)
 Most Popular Actress (cinema)
 Best Playback Singer (male)
 Best Playback Singer (female)
 Best Actor (drama) 
 Best Actress (drama)
 Best Actor (drama serial) 
 Best Actress (drama serial)
 Most Popular Singer (male)
 Best Popular Singer (female)
 Best Music Director (audio)
 Best Musc Drector (film)
 Best Lyric Writer (audio)
 Best Lyric Writer (film)

Babisas Award 2012

Babisas Award 2011

Babisas Award 2019

Babisas Award 2020

Babisas Award 2021

See also
National Film Awards (Bangladesh)
Meril Prothom Alo Awards
Bachsas Awards
Ifad Film Club Award
Channel i Music Awards

References

Awards established in 2004
Bangladeshi media awards